Amityville is an unincorporated community in Berks County, Pennsylvania, United States, near the borough of Pottstown. It is located on Old Swede Road in Amity Township.

History
The post office Amityville contained was named Athol. The Athol post office was established in 1885.

Notable person
William Auman, American Brigadier General (1838–1920)

References

Unincorporated communities in Berks County, Pennsylvania
Unincorporated communities in Pennsylvania